The Zurich Barcelona Marathon (Catalan: Marató Barcelona), formerly the Marathon Catalunya and later the Marató de Catalunya, is an annual marathon race over the classic distance of  usually held in March in Barcelona, Catalonia, Spain, and first held in 1978 in Palafrugell, Catalonia.  The marathon is categorized as a Silver Label Road Race by World Athletics.

History 
The marathon was first started by a Catalan chemist, Ramón Oliu, after he had run the New York City Marathon in 1976.  Because there were no marathons in Catalonia at the time, Oliu decided to organize the first one in 1978.  He held it in Palafrugell because he was unable to obtain a permit to hold it in Barcelona, and he named the race "Catalunya 78".  This race also has the distinction of being the first popular marathon in Spain, as the Madrid Marathon was held later that same year.

The marathon was held in Palafrugell again in 1979 due to a lack of a Barcelonian permit, but was subsequently moved in Barcelona in 1980.  The marathon eventually became known as the "Marathon Catalunya".

After a number of intermediate name changes, the name was eventually changed to "Zurich Marató de Barcelona" in 2012.

In 2010, Kenyan Jackson Kipkoech Kotut won the race in a time of 2:07:30 hours. This was a course record and also the fastest marathon ever run in Spain. Over 10,000 participants took part in the event that year.

The 2020 edition of the race was postponed due to the coronavirus pandemic, with the event being rescheduled for 25 October 2020. Runners were also given the option of deferring their entry to the 2021 event, set to be held on 14 March 2021 instead of the revised 2020 date.

On 14 August 2020 the event was again cancelled, and is now set to return on 7 November 2021. Entrants are given the option of free entry in the new date with the possibility of running the half-marathon event in October for free also, or taking a refund, though as of 21 August 2020 many entrants report not having received any information about how to select from the alternative options.

Course 

The route starts and finishes at Plaça d'Espanya, at the foot of Montjuïc, in the Sants-Montjuïc district. It passes Camp Nou, back to Plaça d'Espanya, past Sagrada Família, near the beach in northeast, around the old city, back to the shore and back to Plaça d'Espanya. It has many straight parts separated by sharp street corners. The route feels flat, but looks more hilly on a height profile diagram. It has some long slow inclines, notably around 25–27 km and 39–41 km.

The marathon course was changed for the 2019 edition of the race, resulting in both course records being broken that year.

Winners 

Key: Course record (in bold)

Multiple wins

By country

See also 
 Empúries Marathon

Notes

References

List of winners
Barcelona Marathon. Association of Road Racing Statisticians. Retrieved on 2013-04-13.

External links

Official website

Marathons in Spain
Athletics competitions in Catalonia
Spring (season) events in Spain
Recurring sporting events established in 1978
Athletics in Barcelona